Gaurena grisescens is a moth in the family Drepanidae. It is found in China (Yunnan, Sichuan, Tibet).

References

Moths described in 1894
Thyatirinae